TZ Ostrovia Ostrów Wielkopolski formerly the Klub Motorowy Ostrów Wielkopolski are a Polish motorcycle speedway team based in Ostrów Wielkopolski. The team currently race in the 1. Liga.

Stadium 
The Municipal Stadium, Ostrów is located on ulica Piłsudskiego (Piłsudski street). It contains 12,000 seats. The track is 372 metres long and has a granite surface. The track record was made by Robert Miśkowiak (63.05 sec on 28 June 2009).

History

1948 to 1959 
The club competed in the inaugural 1948 Polish speedway season, under the name of Klub Motorowy Ostrów Wielkopolski and won the silver medal the following year in 1949. In 1950, the second honour came to the club, now known as Stal Ostrów Wielkopolski, when they won the bronze medal. 

In 1953, the speedway operation of Stal Ostrów Wlkp. moved to Świętochłowice but in 1955, the club now called Kolejarz-Stal Ostrów Wlkp. reappeared in the second division and continued as Ostrovia Ostrów Wlkp. until 1959, when the club disbanded again.

1979 to 1999 

Although speedway meetings took place in Ostrów in the 1969s a team did not return until the 1979 Polish speedway season, where Ostrovia Ostrów finished last in the second division. After 9 years of second division speedway the team led by Jacek Brucheiser finally won promotion by winning 2nd division in 1988. The success was short lived because they were relegated the very next season and then struggled for the next five years before failing to take their place in the 1995 league. The club gained promotion in 1997 but once again suffered relegation the following season.

2000 to 2013
When the Ekstraliga arrived in 2000, the club suffered a further relegation to 2. Liga. Ostrow won a promotion play off in 2003 to return to 1.Liga. The 2009 was a disaster for the club after Klub Motorowy Ostrów Wielkopolski folded and was replaced by TZ Ostrovia Ostrów Wielkopolski who finished last in 1.Liga. The club won 2. Liga in 2014 but once again problems resulted in them being unable to field a team in 2016

2017 to present
The team returned to action in 2017 and won promotion to 1. Liga in 2019. After winning the 1.Liga in 2021 the club competed in the Ekstraliga for the first time in 2022 but were once again relegated.

Teams

2023 team
  Grzegorz Walasek
  Oliver Berntzon
  Matias Nielsen
  Tobiasz Musielak
  Victor Palovaara
  Kacper Grzelak
  Sebastian Szostak
  Jakub Krawczyk
  Gracjan Szostak
  Jakub Poczta

Previous teams

 2022 Squad 

  Tomasz Gapiński
  Oliver Berntzon
  Tim Sørensen
  Grzegorz Walasek
  Chris Holder
  Filip Hjelmland
  Kacper Grzelak
  Jakub Krawczyk
  Jakub Poczta

Notable riders

Honours

References 

Polish speedway teams
Sport in Ostrów Wielkopolski